Cockfield is a village on the edge of Teesdale, County Durham, England. Remains found on Cockfield Fell suggest there was a settlement in the area during the Iron Age. The parish church, dedicated to St Mary the Virgin, probably dates from the late 12th century.

Coal mining began in the area in the medieval period. When the South West Durham coalfield was opened in the 19th and 20th centuries the population of the village grew significantly. The last coal mine closed in 1962.

Notable residents
One of the more illustrious families to hail from Cockfield was the Martindale family. George Dixon (1731–1785) owned coal mines and was a keen inventor, and was probably the first to use coal gas for illumination. His brother Jeremiah Dixon (1733–1779), an astronomer, went to America with Charles Mason in 1763 to survey the boundaries of Maryland and Pennsylvania thereby creating the 'Mason–Dixon line'.

Local amenities

Public houses
There are three public houses in the village, the Queen's Head, the King's Head, and the Cockfield Working Men's Club.

Stores
There are three stores in the village of Cockfield, a Co-operative, newsagents, and also a general store, which incorporates as coffee shop.
The village also has a Pharmacy, which also contains the Post Office.

Schools
The local primary school is Cockfield County Primary School.

Churches
The two churches that can be found in Cockfield are the CofE Church of Saint Mary the Virgin and the Cockfield Methodist Church.

Transport
Whilst Cockfield once had a railway, this was closed to passengers in 1958, before its complete closure in 1962.  It is now served by bus services from Arriva North East and Scarlet Band with links to Darlington, Bishop Auckland, Barnard Castle, Durham (number 6) and the retail park at Tindale crescent.

Cockfield Fell
Cockfield Fell is described as "one of the most important early industrial landscapes in Britain". In addition to four Iron Age (or Romano-British) settlement enclosures, there is evidence within the landscape of early coal mines (the Bishop of Durham licensed mining here at least as early as 1303), medieval agricultural field patterns, centuries of quarrying activity, a railway line established in the 1830s and several earlier tramways. All together, Cockfield Fell constitutes England's largest Scheduled Ancient Monument, described as 'an incomparable association of field monuments relating to the Iron settlement history and industrial evolution of a northern English County'. One reason for its preservation - unusual for a lowland fell - is that it was not subject to enclosure in the 18th or 19th century, perhaps due to its highly industrialised past.

References

External links

 Cockfield Fell Heritage Walk

 
Villages in County Durham
Civil parishes in County Durham
Industrial archaeological sites in England